Ronald C. Packard, D.M.D. (born January 19, 1931) is a retired Republican politician from California who served in the U.S. House of Representatives from 1983 to 2001.

Biography
Packard was born and raised in Meridian, Idaho. He attended Meridian High School, Brigham Young University, Portland State University, and University of Oregon Dental School (now the Oregon Health & Science University School of Dentistry), where he received a D.M.D. in 1957. He was in the Navy Dental Corps during 1957–1959, and worked as a dentist after leaving the Navy.

Packard first entered politics as a trustee of the Carlsbad Unified School District in California, and served during 1962–1974. He was elected to the Carlsbad City Council in 1976, then elected Mayor of Carlsbad in 1978. While mayor, he was active in community and regional affairs, serving on the transportation policy committee of the League of California Cities, as a Director of North County Transit District, and as President of the Council of Mayors for San Diego County.

1982 election
In 1982, Packard lost the Republican primary for the United States House of Representatives in a crowded field of candidates to Johnnie Crean by 92 votes.<ref>Barone, Michael; and Ujifusa, Grant. The Almanac of American Politics 1988', p. 176. National Journal, 1987.</ref>  Crean's character came into issue, with his negative ads and false claim of endorsement by Ronald Reagan, so Packard launched a campaign as a write-in candidate. Packard ran a poll which found that voters would vote for him, especially if they knew how to write him in. Packard campaigned with a gigantic pencil as a prop while giving out golf pencils to district residents. An organized effort among fellow Mormons helped the campaign. Packard won the election by 11,000 votes to become the first independent write-in candidate to defeat candidates of both the Democratic and Republican parties.  NPR's Ken Rudin described the race this way:

Packard was only the third person to be elected to Congress as a write-in candidate, a victory later documented in Campaigns and Elections'' and due in part to the efforts of Russell Reed Benedict. The two previously successful congressional write-in candidates were U.S. Rep. Joe Skeen (R-New Mexico 2d Dist.) in 1980 and Sen. Strom Thurmond (R-S. Carolina) in 1954. Subsequently, Alaska Republican U.S. Senator Lisa Murkowski lost her party primary in 2010, but waged a successful write-in campaign against Joe Miller, the Republican primary winner and narrowly defeated him in the general election. Upon being sworn in, Packard joined the Republican caucus.  He was reelected as a Republican eight times with little opposition in the heavily Republican district.

Tenure
Packard's congressional career included membership on the House Appropriations Committee. Packard served a total of nine terms and then retired from the House at the end of his term in 2001 to spend time with his family. In Congress he was known as a deficit hawk, a critic of legislative "pork", and opponent of illegal immigration. He was succeeded by Republican Darrell Issa.

Retirement and private life
A U.S. Post Office building in Oceanside, California was named for him in 2002.

Packard and his wife Jean live in Utah. They had seven children. Packard works part-time as a lobbyist in Washington, D.C.

The westernmost 16.6-miles of California State Route 78 between Interstate 5 in Oceanside, California and Interstate 15 in Escondido, California is designated Ronald Packard Parkway.

References

External links

 

1931 births
Living people
People from Meridian, Idaho
Military personnel from Idaho
American Latter Day Saints
Mayors of places in California
School board members in California
American dentists
Oregon Health & Science University alumni
Brigham Young University alumni
Portland State University alumni
California city council members
Republican Party members of the United States House of Representatives from California
Members of Congress who became lobbyists